Kidanganad  is a village in Wayanad district in the state of Kerala, India.

Demographics
 India census, Kidanganad had a population of 9157 with 4610 males and 4547 females.

Transportation
Kidanganad can be accessed from Sultan Battery. The Periya ghat road connects Mananthavady to Kannur and Thalassery.  The Thamarassery mountain road connects Calicut with Kalpetta. The Kuttiady mountain road connects Vatakara with Kalpetta and Mananthavady. The Palchuram mountain road connects Kannur and Iritty with Mananthavady.  The road from Nilambur to Ooty is also connected to Wayanad through the village of Meppadi.

The nearest railway station is at Mysore and the nearest airports is Kannur International Airport, 58 km.

References

Villages in Wayanad district
Sultan Bathery area